Frank Hale Touret (March 25, 1875 – August 2, 1945) was an American prelate who served as the fourth Missionary Bishop of Idaho from 1919 till 1924.

Early life and education
Touret was born in Salem, Massachusetts on March 25, 1875, the son of Benjamin A. Touret and Lucy Marks. He graduated from Harvard University with a B.A. in 1897 and an M.A. in 1901. He enrolled into the Episcopal Theological seminary and graduated in 1903, after which he was ordained deacon that same year. In 1921 he was awarded a Doctor of Divinity by Whitman College.

Priesthood
Touret served as curate of St John's Church in Providence, Rhode Island. Later he became curate of Christ Church Detroit. In 1908, he became rector of St Luke's Church in Fort Collins, Colorado and in 1910 he became rector of Grace Church in Colorado Springs, Colorado.

Bishop
Touret was elected as Bishop of Western Colorado in 1916. He was consecrated on February 2, 1917, by Presiding Bishop Daniel S. Tuttle. In 1919 he was elected missionary Bishop of Idaho, a post he held till 1924, when he resigned due to ill health. Touet also served as acting Bishop of Utah from 1917 till 1919, after its bishop, Paul Jones, was forced to resign and take a leave of absence due to his opposition to WWI. In 1926, Touret became rector of the Church of the Good Shepherd in Waban, Massachusetts. He retired in 1929 due to his poor health. Touret died of a heart attack in Nantucket, Massachusetts on August 2, 1945.

Family
Touret was married to Irene Chittenden Farquhar and together had one son.

References

1875 births
1945 deaths
American Episcopalians
Episcopal bishops of Idaho
People from Salem, Massachusetts
Episcopal Divinity School alumni
Harvard University alumni
Episcopal bishops of Western Colorado